Coralliodrilus rugosus is a species of clitellate oligochaete worm, first found in Belize, on the Caribbean side of Central America. It is found in a range of sediments near the limits of saline groundwater, but never below tidal zones.

References

Further reading
Diaz, Robert J., and Christer Erseus. "Habitat preferences and species associations of shallow-water marine Tubificidae (Oligochaeta) from the barrier reef ecosystems off Belize, Central America." Aquatic Oligochaete Biology V. Springer Netherlands, 1994. 93-105.
Marotta, Roberto, Marco Ferraguti, and Christer Erseus. "A phylogenetic analysis of Tubificinae and Limnodriloidinae (Annelida, Clitellata, Tubificidae) using sperm and somatic characters." Zoologica Scripta 32.3 (2003): 255-278.
Erséus, Christer. "Sperm types and their use for a phylogenetic analysis of aquatic clitellates." Hydrobiologia 402 (1999): 225-237.

External links
WORMS

Invertebrates of Central America
Tubificina